Vidya Vikas Academy(VVA) is an English medium school co-educational in Goa. The school is affiliated to Central Board of Secondary Education (CBSE) . The school has 29 classrooms. The school offers classes from Nursery to 12th standard. It was established in the year 1994. The school had humble beginnings  housed in the same rented premises that had earlier used by Shree Damodar College of Commerce & Economics and Govind Ramnath Kare College of Law. Today the school occupies a spacious building in the Vidya Vikas Mandal Campus and offers its pupils state of art facilities. In 2012, Vidya Vikas Academy decided it would have higher secondary section(11th and 12th).

Building 
The school is spread out across 12,140 m2 with total built up area of 2,900 m2 and 1,400 m2 playground. The school has three phases. The School Campus is surrounded with Laterite Wall Fencing and Security Guard at the Gate. Phase II has Provided Additional Classrooms and Houses the Pre-Primary Section. Phase III – have additional classrooms and special rooms and houses the higher secondary section. The Higher Secondary Section has spacious A.C. Classrooms, Laboratories, Computer Centre, Library, Office, Cafeteria, Infirmary and Toilets. In April 2016, a composting facility was inaugurated at Vidya Vikas Mandal's (VVM) Vidya Vikas Academy(VVA), Margao, by Dempo Industries executive director Pallavi Dempo.

Faculty 
The school has a total of 70 teaching staff and 20 non teaching staff. The principal of the school is Joble Bijoy.

Management 
The school is run by the Vidya Vikas Mandal managing committee of 14 members headed by Mrs. Sheela Gaunekar(Manager and Chairperson) and Mr. Ganesh Daivajna(President Vidya Vikas Mandal).

External links 
 Vidya Vikas Academy's Website
 Vidya Vikas Academy's Senior Secondary Website

References 

High schools and secondary schools in Goa
Educational institutions established in 1994
1994 establishments in Goa
Education in South Goa district
Private schools in Goa